Jestice is a village and municipality in the Rimavská Sobota District of the Banská Bystrica Region of Slovakia. According to 2021 census, more than 95% of inhabitants belong to the Hungarian ethnic group.

History
The village dates back to the 11th century. The first reference to the settlement comes from 1333 (Jezthe). It belonged to  Felician Zach and later on passed to the Méhy family. In 1427, the village was mentioned under the name Lesthe as a property of the Lórántffys. Later, it belonged to the Eger Abbey and to zeman family Vécsey. From 1938 to 1945, it belonged to Hungary under the First Vienna Award.

Genealogical resources

The records for genealogical research are available at the state archive "Statny Archiv in Banska Bystrica, Slovakia"

 Roman Catholic church records (births/marriages/deaths): 1761-1896 (parish B)
 Reformated church records (births/marriages/deaths): 1769-1858 (parish B)

See also
 List of municipalities and towns in Slovakia

References

External links
 
 
https://web.archive.org/web/20071217080336/http://www.statistics.sk/mosmis/eng/run.html
http://www.jestice.gemer.org
Surnames of living people in Jestice

Villages and municipalities in Rimavská Sobota District
Hungarian communities in Slovakia